The Cypriot Cup is the main cup competition in Cypriot football, run by the Cyprus Football Association (CFA). It began in 1934, the same season with the Cypriot Championship. It is the second most important competition for Cypriot club teams after Cypriot Championship. Only the Cypriot First Division and the second division teams are participating in the competition.

The sponsor of the competition since 1962 is Coca-Cola and thus officially known as Cyprus Coca-Cola Cup.

History
The Cypriot Cup started in the 1934–35 season, when the Cyprus Football Association was founded. The 1934–35 Cypriot Cup was the first competition held by CFA, since it took part before the 1934–35 Cypriot First Division. The Cyprus Cup is held every season since 1934 expect:
The period 1941–1944 the championship was not held due to World War II. Many Cypriots were volunteer enlisted in the Greek and English army, and also formed a Cypriot constitution. Most teams have undertaken national project by collecting money and clothing to be sent to Greece in order to assist the Greek people and the army. Moreover, many Greek refugees fled to Cyprus. Due to the prevailed war conditions the CFA decided to suspend all the competitions. 
The periods 1955–58 and 1959–61 was not held due to the unstable situation in Cyprus during EOKA fight. Meanwhile, a special cup was held in 1958–59 season. That season the Cypriot Championship was not held for the same reasons. When the situation calmed down and Cyprus was going to gain its independence, CFA decided to activate the teams that were inactive for several months and decided to launch a special cup called the "Independence Cup". The competition was official and the winner team was listed to Cypriot Cup's winners.

The cup was held again in the 1961–62 Cypriot Cup. The sponsor of the competition since 1962 is Coca-Cola Cyprus (Lanitis Bros Ltd). The period 1998–99 the Cypriot Cup rename officially to Cyprus Coca-Cola Cup.

Participating teams
At first, only the teams of Cypriot First Division were taking part in the Cypriot Cup. The Cypriot Second Division founded in 1934 like as the Cypriot First Division, but it was unofficial, since the league was consisted of teams that didn't participate in the Cypriot First Division and the reserve teams of the Cypriot First Division clubs.

Since 1952–53, the teams of the Cypriot Second Division are taking part in the Cypriot Cup, with the only exception being the period 1963–64. In some editions of the decades of 60 and 70, in the competition participated only the first teams of that league (or only the champions). From 1975–76, all the teams of Cypriot Second Division are taking part in the Cyprus Cup. No Second Division team ever reach the final but they managed to qualify to the semi-finals four times (Nea Salamis Famagusta in 1953–54, Orfeas Nicosia in 1983–84, PAEEK in 1984–85 and AEP Paphos in 2005–06).

From 1971–72 until 2007–08, the teams of the Cypriot Third Division were taking part in Cypriot Cup. From 2008–09, the Cypriot Third Division teams are not allowed to take part to Cypriot Cup but they can (optional) take part to the Cypriot Cup for lower divisions. No Third Division team ever reached the final or the semifinals, but they managed to qualify to the quarter-finals once (Chalkanoras Idaliou in 1987–88).

The teams of the Cypriot Fourth Division were taking part to the Cypriot Cup from 1986–87 until 2007–08. From 2008–09, the Cypriot Fourth Division teams were not allowed to take part to Cypriot Cup but they could (optional) take part to the Cypriot Cup for lower divisions.

Format
The structure of the cup was changed some times during the seasons.
 From 1934–35 until 1983–84, the competition was traditionally a pure knockout tournament. In all rounds each tie was played as a single leg and was held at the home ground of the one of the two teams, according to the draw results. Each tie winner was qualifying to the next round. If a match was drawn, extra time was following. If extra time was ended also in a draw, there was a replay at the ground of the team who were away for the first game. Exceptions were the 1958–59 Cypriot Cup and the 1973–74 Cypriot Cup, with all ties being two-legged, except the final which was a single match.
 From 1984–85 until 2001–02, the competition was traditionally a pure knockout tournament. The preliminary rounds were played as a single leg and was held at the home ground of the one of the two teams, according to the draw results. From the first round all ties were two-legged, except the final which was a single match. 
 From 2002–03 until 2005–06, the competition was traditionally a pure knockout tournament. The preliminary rounds were played as a single leg and was held at the home ground of the one of the two teams, according to the draw results. From the first round all ties were two-legged, except the round of 16 where the teams were drawn into four groups of four. The teams of each group played against each other twice, once at their home and once away. The group winners and runners-up of each group advanced to the quarter-finals. The final was a single match. 
 From 2006–07 until 2007–08, the competition was traditionally a pure knockout tournament. The preliminary rounds were played as a single leg and was held at the home ground of the one of the two teams, according to the draw results. From the first round all ties were two-legged, except the quarter-finals where the teams were drawn into two groups of four. The teams of each group played against each other twice, once at their home and once away. The group winners and runners-up of each group advanced to the semi-finals. The final was a single match. 
 From 2008–09 until 2010–11, the competition was traditionally a pure knockout tournament. All ties were two-legged, except the final which was in a single match. Since 2011–12 Cypriot Cup the preliminary round was played as a single leg and was held at the home ground of the one of the two teams, according to the draw results. From the first round all ties were two-legged, except the final which was a single match.
 Since 2011–12, the competition is traditionally a pure knockout tournament. The preliminary round is played as a single leg and is held at the home ground of the one of the two teams, according to the draw results. From the first round all ties are two-legged, except the final which is played in a single match.

European participations 
Since 1962–63, the winner of the Cypriot Cup was qualifying to one of the UEFA competitions. First, it was competing to the UEFA Cup Winners' Cup. If the cup winner was also the winner of the Cypriot First Division (so had already qualified to the European Champion Clubs' Cup/UEFA Champions League), at the UEFA Cup Winners' Cup was participating the finalist team. At 1999 the UEFA Cup Winners' Cup was abolished. The Cypriot Cup winner was taking part to the UEFA Cup and since 2009 to the UEFA Europa League.

In all seasons, the Cypriot Cup winner was qualifying to the best place that Cyprus had at the UEFA Cup/UEFA Europa League (the Cypriot Cup Winner could start in a later qualifying round according to Cyprus ranking, compared to the other Cypriot teams that qualified to the same European cup through the championship). Previously, if the cup winner was also the winner of the Cypriot First Division (so had already qualified to the European Champion Clubs' Cup/UEFA Champions League), at the UEFA Cup Winners' Cup was participating the finalist team. Since 2015, after UEFA's decision, if the cup winner was also the winner of the Cypriot First Division, then the place of the Cypriot Cup winner at the UEFA Europa League is given to the second team of the domestic championship, and the fourth team also qualifies to the same European competition.

Host stadiums (finals)
The Cypriot Cup Final took place in six different stadiums. From 1934–35 until 1974–75, the final was held in Nicosia, at the old GSP Stadium, regardless if that stadium was the home ground of the one of the two finalist. The only exception was the 1970–71 Cypriot Cup, were a replay final was needed when the first final between Omonia and Anorthosis, that took part at the GSP Stadium (Omonia's home ground), was drawn. The replay played at the GSE Stadium, the Anorthosis' home ground at Famagusta. GSP Stadium was chosen as the ground of the final because of its big capacity, compared to the other stadiums in Cyprus.

At 1937–38, AEL Limassol was the first team outside Nicosia (and so they didn't use the GSP Stadium as home ground) to take part in the final. The opponent was Enosis Neon Trust and the ground of the final was the GSP Stadium, which was Trust's home ground. Cup winner was Trust. The next season, the finalists were AEL Limassol and APOEL. Although that the final was set to take place at the GSP Stadium (APOEL's home ground), AEL reacted and asked for the final to be played at the GSO Stadium, their home ground in Limassol. A draw was made between the two stadiums, with the GSP to be drawn as the stadium of the final.

In 1975, the Tsirion Stadium at Limassol was built and the final of the 1975–76 Cypriot Cup took part at that stadium. The next two finals played at the GSP Stadium. The final of the 1977–78 Cypriot Cup was the last one that took part at the old GSP Stadium. The final of the 1978–79 Cypriot Cup played at the new build Makario Stadium at Nicosia.

Since 1981, when Cyprus had most appropriate stadiums for holding such matches, the neutrality of the ground of the final was always the goal, that if teams were coming from different cities, then the final would take place in a third city. At first, there were stadiums from Nicosia (Makario) and Limassol (Tsirion). Until 1989, when the GSZ Stadium in Larnaca was built, when the opponents in the final were teams from Nicosia and Limassol, the ground of the final were determined by a draw. That was need in three occasions (1981–82 Cypriot Cup Omonoia-Apollon Limassol, 1985–86 Cypriot Cup Apollon-APOEL, 1987–88 Cypriot Cup AC Omonoia-AEL) with always the Tsirion Stadium to be the winner.

According to the cup's proclamation, if the final ended in a draw, a replay was played at the home stadium of the other team. This was happened in the 1981–82, when the first final which was held at the Tsirion ended in a draw and the replay was held at the Makario. In 1989, the new GSZ Stadium was available and hosted for the first time the 1992–93 final.

In 1999, the new GSP Stadium was built, and hosted the final of the 1999-2000 Cypriot Cup between Omonia and APOEL. The new GSP Stadium was and is the common home ground of these two teams. Due to the large capacity and the modern facilities, the GSP is the first choice for the cup final, although is not a neutral stadium as the presence of APOEL and Omonia in the final is often. If the opponent team (based outside Nicosia) brought objections, a draw is made between the home stadiums of the two teams. This happened for the first time in the 2005-06 Cypriot Cup (final APOEL-AEK Larnaca), with the new GSZ Stadium to win the draw. In the 2015–16 Cypriot Cup (final Apollon-Omonia), a draw was made between the Tsirion Stadium and the GSP, with the first to win the draw.

In some cases, the opponent team agreed the final to be played at the GSP Stadium, even though it was their opponent's home ground. This was done in five finals. The first time was the 2004-05 Cypriot Cup when Digenis Akritas Morphou (which had as home ground the Makario Stadium) accepted the final against Omonia to take place at the GSP, their opponent's home ground. The 2006–07, Anorthosis accepted to play the final against Omonia at the GSP, and the same did in the 2007-08 Cypriot Cup final against APOEL. The 2011–12, AEL accepted to play the final against Omonia at the GSP, as Ermis Aradippou did in the 2013-14 Cypriot Cup against APOEL.

For the 2016-17 season, the final is scheduled from Cyprus Football Association to be held at the GSP Stadium, no matter which are the two participating teams.

The following table shows the stadiums that held the Cypriot Cup finals from the 1934–35 season until 2015–16 season, the number of finals that each stadium held and the seasons of the every was played in each stadium. Although there are 77 editions of the Cypriot Cup, the finals that are played are 82, as in five cases the final ended in a draw and rematch was played. The replay could be played either at the same stadium or at the home stadium of the other team, where the first final was held at the home ground of one of the two opponents.

Cypriot Cup Finals

The table below lists the teams that participated in the final of the cup each season.

Performances

Performance by club

Participated clubs per division
The following table shows the number of participating teams in the cup per season. Furthermore, it shows the number of participating teams per division.

1APOEL participated in the 1974–75 Cypriot Cup, although were unofficially competing in the 1974–75 Cypriot First Division.

2The 1974–75 season, due to the Turkish invasion of Cyprus which forced many teams that had their headquarters to the north Cyprus to be closed temporarily or permanently, CFA decided to have a Special mixed championship of Second & Third Division. In this championship could participate all the teams of the Second Division and Third Division. Participation was optional. The championship had two geographical groups. The winners of each group were playing against each other in the final phase and the winners were the champions of the league. The winner was considered as the 1974–75 Cypriot Second Division champions.

Participations and performance per club
The following table shows the participations per club in the cup since its foundation up to the 2016-17 season, and the statistics of each team regarding the wins, the times were finalists, their presence in the semifinals and the quarterfinals, and the number of qualifications and eliminations of each team achieved or suffered.

The teams are classified based on the number of entries in the competition. So far, a total of 158 teams participated in the Cypriot Cup. No team has participated in all the cup editions (74 in total, including the 2016-17 season). APOEL and AEL were absent only from a single cup season, the season they were participating in the Greek league.

Legend:

 The presence in the quarterfinals and semifinals is credited regardless of the result. That is, if a team reached the final is credited (beyond winning or being the finalists) a participation in the quarterfinals (if any) and an entry in the semifinals.
 Finalists of the cup are credited an elimination for any final they lost.
 The Cup Winners are not credited a qualification for each Cup they won.

Notes:

1The team has 4 participations as PAEK, 3 participations as PAEK/AEK and 40 participations as PAEEK.
2The team has 8 participations as APEP Limassol and 25 participations as APEP Pitsilias.
3The team has some participations as Enosis-Keravnos.
4The team has 11 participations as Lefkoşa Türk Spor Kulübü and 6 participations as Çetinkaya Türk.
5The team has 3 participations as AEM Mesogis and 3 participations as AEM Mesogis/Giolou.
6The team has 2 participations as AOL Lakatamias and 4 participations as AOL – Omonia Lakatamias.

See also
Cypriot Super Cup
Cypriot Women's Cup – Women's edition

Sources

References

Bibliography

External links

Official website
Cup news at federation's website
History of Coca-Cola Cup

 
1
Cyprus
1934 establishments in Cyprus
Recurring sporting events established in 1934